The New Zealand Republican Party of 1967 was a political party which campaigned for the creation of a New Zealand republic. It was founded by Bruce Jesson in 1967, and was linked to the Republican Association.

It did not win any seats in Parliament, and was dissolved in 1974. Instead, a new publication was created, The Republican, which was published until 1995. In 1995 another republican party, which was also subsequently dissolved, arose under the same name. The two are unconnected.

References

Citations

Sources

See also
 Republicanism in New Zealand
 Republican Association of New Zealand
 Bruce Jesson

Political parties established in 1967
Defunct political parties in New Zealand
Republican parties
Republicanism in New Zealand
Single-issue political parties in New Zealand